Elavamkodu Desam is a 1998 Indian Malayalam-language period drama film written and directed by K. G. George. It stars Mammootty and Rajeev, with Khushbu, Thilakan and Babu Namboothiri in major supporting roles. It was the last film of K. G. George.

Plot

Jathavedan is invited to Elavamkodu Desam, a princely state, to treat the queen. He learns that Unikkoman, the wicked king of Elavamkodu Desam, rose to power in a coup and killing the noble king Udayavarman. Unikkoman was an ardent devotee to Kali and performed human sacrifices to appease the goddess and receive unchallengeable power. Meanwhile, Unikkoman's queen Ammalu is tortured in her sleep by seeing the departed souls, including that of her first husband, who comes to torment her. How Jathavedan raises an army to return the crown to its true heir form the crux of the story.

Cast

 Mammootty as Jathavedan
 Shruthi Raj as Nandini, the princess
 Rajeev as Unikkoman
 Khushbu as Ammalu, Unikkoman's wife
 Thilakan as Mooss
 Babu Namboothiri as Raru Asan
 Jagathy Sreekumar as Kurungodan
 Vakkom Jayalal as Baladevan, the prince
 Spadikam George as Idicheman, Unikkoman's army chief
 Manka Mahesh as Mangalabhai Thampuratti
 Captain Raju as Udayavarma
 Narendra Prasad as Adityan, Unikkoman's uncle and Ammalu's first husband
 Bharath Gopi as Agnisharman, Jathadevan's uncle
 V. K. Sreeraman as Nethran
 Subair
 Abu Salim

Soundtrack
o. N. V. Kurup wrote the songs.

"Engu Ninnengu Ninnu" (male) -  K. J. Yesudas
"Neram" - K. J. Yesudas
"Engu Ninnengu Ninnu" (female) - K. S. Chithra
"Aadukal Meyunna" (female) - K. S. Chithra
"Engu Ninnengu Ninnu" (duet) - K. J. Yesudas, K. S. Chithra
"Chembakamalaroli" - K. J. Yesudas, K. S. Chithra
"Aadukal Meyunna" (male) - Biju Narayanan
"Iniyente Kunjithathe" - Sujatha, Arunmozhi, C. O. Anto

References

External links
 

1990s Malayalam-language films
Kalarippayattu films
Films shot in Palakkad
Films shot in Ottapalam
Films scored by Vidyasagar
Films directed by K. G. George